The Secretariat of Environment and Natural Resources (in Spanish: Secretaría del Medio Ambiente y Recursos Naturales, SEMARNAT) is Mexico's environment ministry. Its head, the Secretary of the Environment and Natural Resources, is a member of the federal executive cabinet and is appointed by the President of Mexico. In September 2020, President Andrés Manuel López Obrador appointed María Luisa Albores González as Secretary of the Environment and Natural Resources, the third person to occupy the post since López Obrador became President less than two years earlier in December 2018.

The Secretariat is charged with the mission of protecting, restoring, and conserving the ecosystems, natural resources, assets and environmental services of Mexico with the goal of fostering sustainable development.

Functions
The Secretariat of Environment and Natural Resources of México is the Secretary of State to which, according to Law of Federal Public Administration in its Article 32a, corresponds to the release of the following functions:
 Promote the protection, restoration and conservation of ecosystems, natural resources, goods and environmental services, to help monitor their use and ensure sustainable development.
 Develop and implement a national policy on natural resources, in such that the administration of such policy is not borne by state and local governments, nor by individuals and corporations.
Promote environmental management within the national territory, in coordination with federal, state and municipal governments, and with participation from the private sector.
 Evaluate and providencie determination to the environmental impact statements for development projects submitted for public, social and private decision on the environmental risk studies, as well as programs for the prevention of accidents with ecological impact.
 Implement national policies on climate change and protection of the ozone layer.
 Direct work and studies on national meteorological, climatological, hydrological and geohydrological systems, and participate in international conventions on these subjects.
 Regulate and monitor the conservation of streams, lakes and lagoons of federal jurisdiction in protected watersheds, and protect the environment.

To carry out these functions, the Secretariat of Environment and Natural Resources has the following Undersecretaries:
 Undersecretary of Planning and Environmental Policy
 Undersecretary for Environmental Protection Management
 Undersecretary of Environmental Regulation
 Undersecretary of Finance of Mexico

These Undersecretaries are then charged with the operation of the following units of the SEMARNAT:
 National Water Commission
 National Institute in Ecology
 Federal Attorney for Environmental Protection
 National Commission of Natural Protected Areas
 National Forestry Commission
 Mexican Institute of Water Technology
 National Commission for the Knowledge and Use of Biodiversity

List of Secretaries

See also 
 National Forestry Commission of Mexico

References

External links
 Official Mexican Secretariat of Environment and Natural Resources website — 
 Interamerican Association for Environmental Defense

Environment and Natural Resources
Mexico
Mexico
Environment of Mexico
Mexico
Forestry in Mexico
Natural resources in North America
Environment